Borovinka is the name of several rural localities in Russia:
Borovinka, Velsky District, Arkhangelsk Oblast, a village in Pezhemskoye Rural Settlement of Velsky District, Arkhangelsk Oblast
Borovinka, Kotlassky District, Arkhangelsk Oblast, a village in Cheremushskoye Rural Settlement of Kotlassky District, Arkhangelsk Oblast